Stanley York (born August 29, 1931) is an American politician and minister.

Born in Milwaukee, Wisconsin, York went to the Wauwatosa, Wisconsin public schools. In 1953, York graduated from Beloit College and then graduated from Andover Newton Theological School in 1957 with a degree in theology. York was a clergyman and lived in River Falls, Wisconsin. From 1967 to 1969, York served in the Wisconsin State Assembly and was a Republican. In 1976, he was a candidate for the United States Senate, losing to incumbent William Proxmire.

York served under Republican governors as commissioner of the Department of Industry, Labor & Human Relations and as the chair of the state Public Service Commission.

References

Republican Party members of the Wisconsin State Assembly
1931 births
Living people
Politicians from Milwaukee
People from River Falls, Wisconsin
Beloit College alumni